Pehr Victor Edman (14 April 1916 — 19 March 1977) was a Swedish biochemist. He developed a method for sequencing proteins; the Edman degradation.

Early life 
Edman was born in Stockholm, Sweden. In 1935 he started studying medicine at Karolinska Institutet, where he became interested in basic research and received a bachelor in medicine in 1938.  His research was interrupted by the outbreak of World War II, where he was drafted to serve in the Swedish army.  He returned to the Karolinska Institutet where he earned his doctoral degree under advice from Professor Erik Jorpes in 1946.

Developing the Edman Degradation 
At the time Edman started working on Angiotensin, it was just being recognized that proteins are distinct entities with a defined molecular mass, electric charge and structure. This inspired Edman to develop a method, that could be used to determine the sequence of amino acids in the protein. In 1947, he was awarded a travel stipend to go to Rockefeller Institute of Medical Research. When he returned to Sweden in 1950 to be an Assistant Professor at the University of Lund, he published his first paper using the method later known as Edman degradation, to determine the sequence of a protein. To his death, he continued to work to improve the method to be able to determine longer stretches with smaller amounts of sample.

Late career 
In 1957, he moved to Australia to be the director of St. Vincent's School of Medical Research. In 1967, he successfully developed an automated protein sequencer, called the sequenator, with his assistant Geoffrey Begg.

In 1972, he moved to the Max-Planck-Institut of Biochemistry, Martinsried near Munich. He worked with his second wife, Agnes Henschen, and she used Edman's method to sequence fibrinogen.

In 1977, Edman died of a brain tumor after a short coma.

References

EDMAN P. A method for the determination of amino acid sequence in peptides. Arch Biochem. 1949 Jul;22(3):475. PMID 18134557.

External links 
 Australian Dictionary of Biography
 Encyclopedia of Australian Science
 Australian Academy of Science Biographical memoirs

1916 births
1977 deaths
Scientists from Stockholm
Swedish biochemists
Karolinska Institute alumni
Fellows of the Australian Academy of Science
Fellows of the Royal Society
Max Planck Institute directors